So Alive is a live album by English alternative rock band Love and Rockets. It was released on 13 May 2003. It comprises two of the band's live performances: one on 5 December 1987 and the other on 23 March 1996.

Track listing

Personnel 

 Love and Rockets

 Daniel Ash – guitar, vocals
 Kevin Haskins – drums
 David J – bass guitar, backing vocals

 Production

 Marc Kordelos – executive production
 Ritchie Rees – executive production
 Don C. Tyler – mastering

References 

2003 live albums
Love and Rockets (band) albums